The Plum Bayou Homesteads are a collection of Depression-era houses that were part of a planned community established by the federal Resettlement Administration.  The area, now roughly centered on the unincorporated community of Wright, north of Pine Bluff, had 180 farmsteads developed, each with a farmhouse built to one of several standard plans, and included community buildings that now form a core element of Wright.

The district was listed on the National Register of Historic Places in 1975.

See also
National Register of Historic Places listings in Jefferson County, Arkansas

References

Historic districts on the National Register of Historic Places in Arkansas
Buildings and structures completed in 1936
Houses in Jefferson County, Arkansas
National Register of Historic Places in Jefferson County, Arkansas
New Deal in Arkansas
New Deal subsistence homestead communities